Jhilik Bhattacharjee is an Indian actress, who works in Odia and Bengali film industry.

Early life
Bhattacharjee was born in West Bengal. Her father is Mrityunjay Bhattacharjee and mother is Sumana Bhattacharjee. She is trained dancer in Bharat Natyam and Katthak. She has also learnt modern dance from Shiamak Davar Dance Institute. She was also an assistant director under Mani Ratnam.

Personal life
She is married to MLA Pritiranjan Ghadai in a private marriage ceremony in Chilika on 11 March 2020. Her father in law is the Former Finance Minister and BJD Vice President Sri Prafulla Chandra Ghadai.

Career
Bhattacharjee started her career with the Bengali film Tomaye Bhalo Bashi. Apart from Tomaye Bhalo Bashi she has done many Bengali films such as Classmate, Identity, Neel Lohit, Encounter. In 2013 she made her debut with the Odia film Target. Apart from Target she has done many Odia film such as Akhire Akhire, Lekhu Lekhu Lekhi Deli, Super Michua, Zabardast Premika, Love You Hamesha.

Filmography

Awards

References

External links 
 
 Jhilik Bhattacharjee Moviebuff profile

Living people
Actresses from West Bengal
Actresses in Odia cinema
Actresses in Bengali cinema
Indian film actresses
Ollywood
Year of birth missing (living people)